For Ladies Only is a cover/compilation album by Killdozer, released in April 1989 through Touch and Go Records on various formats, including LP. CD, cassette, picture disc LP and a box of five 7" singles on different colors of vinyl.

Track listing

This song was on "Side G" (fourth single A-side) with "Funk #49" on "Side H."  The fifth single was "American Pie" split between the two sides.

Personnel
Killdozer
Michael Gerald – vocals, bass guitar
Bill Hobson – guitar
Dan Hobson – drums
Production and additional personnel
Terry Talbot – photography
Butch Vig – production

References

External links 
 

1989 compilation albums
Albums produced by Butch Vig
Covers albums
Killdozer (band) albums
Touch and Go Records compilation albums